Philip S. LeSourd is a linguist and an anthropology professor at Indiana University in the United States. He is one of the world's foremost experts on the Maliseet-Passamaquoddy language and the Algonquian language family.

LeSourd earned both a bachelor's degree and a Ph.D. in linguistics at MIT. He became fascinated with Algonquian languages after a class in the Mesquakie (Fox) language from Ives Goddard at Harvard soon after finishing his bachelor's degree. At the instigation of Karl Teeter and later Ken Hale, he spent time residing among the Maliseet and Passamaquoddy communities in Maine, United States and New Brunswick, Canada. He studied the language both academically, with expert Robert Leavitt of the Mi'kmaq - Maliseet Institute at the University of New Brunswick, and through study with a variety of native speakers. LeSourd, Leavitt, and native Passamaquoddy speaker David Francis, Sr. launched a Maliseet-Passamaquoddy to English dictionary project, which resulted in a published dictionary entitled Kolusuwakonol, about eight years after the project began. The project has continued since, including with funding by Industry Canada and the National Science Foundation, and has been made available online.

LeSourd has continued actively to research Maliseet-Passamaquoddy and a variety of other Algonquian languages.

External links
Faculty profile at Indiana University
Kolusuwakonol: Philips S. Lesourd's English and Passamaquoddy-Maliseet Dictionary at Amazon.com
Accent and Syllable Structure in Passamaquoddy (Outstanding Dissertations in Linguistics) at Amazon.com
Maliseet - Passamaquoddy Dictionary hosted by the Mi'kmaq - Maliseet Institute
Saving a Native Language by Robert M. Leavitt, presented at the “Revitalizing Algonquian Languages Conference: Sharing Effective Language Renewal Practices II” at the Mashantucket Pequot Museum & Research Center, Feb. 2004, credits LeSourd's role

Living people
Harvard University alumni
MIT School of Humanities, Arts, and Social Sciences alumni
American anthropologists
Linguists from the United States
Indiana University faculty
Year of birth missing (living people)